The Valet's Wife is a 1908 American silent short drama film directed by D. W. Griffith. A print of the film exists in the film archive of George Eastman House.

Cast
 Mack Sennett as Reggie Van Twiller
 Charles Avery as Mr. Tubbs
 George Gebhardt as Dinner Guest
 Robert Harron as Valet
 Guy Hedlund
 Arthur V. Johnson as Reverend Haddock
 Florence Lawrence as Nurse
 Owen Moore
 Harry Solter as Postman / Adoption Agent

References

External links
 

1908 films
1908 drama films
Silent American drama films
American silent short films
American black-and-white films
Films directed by D. W. Griffith
1908 short films
1900s American films